Grégory Bradaï (born 20 June 1993) is a male French Polynesian sprinter. He competed in the 100 metres event at the 2015 World Championships in Athletics in Beijing, China.

See also
 French Polynesia at the 2015 World Championships in Athletics

References

1993 births
Living people
Place of birth missing (living people)
French Polynesian male sprinters
World Athletics Championships athletes for French Polynesia